Vivián Benítez (born October 1, 1970, in Asunción) is a Paraguayan beauty queen, model and TV Hostess who was crowned Miss Paraguay 1991.

Pageantry
Benítez was crowned Miss Paraguay in a pageant of that name, held in her country during 1991. Later, on May 17 of that same year, she attended the Miss Universe pageant held in Las Vegas, Nevada, USA.

She placed in the top 10, being the first Paraguayan in 27 years to hold that position (The last time that a Paraguayan made in the semifinals was in 1964), in addition, she was first runner-up in the National Costume award, placing after Miss Colombia.

Personal life
Benítez was a Law student while participating in the Miss Paraguay and Miss Unviverse pageants, however, she put her studies on hold afterwards. She is a certified declamation teacher and studied History of the Arts and Journalism in the USA.

In 1992 she married diplomat and lawyer José Antonio Dos Santos. They raised 2 children. The couple divorced in 2011. Vivian worked as a television anchor in Paraguay's Channel 5 and Channel 13.

Later, she joined Paravisión's anchor staff where she anchors the morning show "Buenos días Paraguay" and later "El mañanero".

References

1970 births
Living people
Miss Universe 1991 contestants
Miss World 1991 delegates
Paraguayan beauty pageant winners
Paraguayan journalists
Paraguayan women journalists
Paraguayan television presenters
Paraguayan women television presenters